The 1952 National Football League Draft was held on January 17, 1952, at Hotel Statler in New York. Selections made by New York Yanks were assigned to the new Dallas Texans.

This was the sixth year that the first overall pick was a bonus pick determined by lottery, with the previous five winners (Chicago Bears in 1947, Washington Redskins in 1948, Philadelphia Eagles in 1949, Detroit Lions in 1950, and New York Giants in 1951) ineligible from the draw; it was won by the Los Angeles Rams, who selected quarterback Bill Wade.

The Washington Post sportswriter Mo Siegel later claimed that Washington Redskins owner George Preston Marshall let him choose a late-round pick. Siegel, he said, chose Tennessee Tech's Flavious Smith to force the first black player onto the all-white Redskins. If true, Marshall likely persuaded NFL Commissioner Bert Bell to remove the choice from the official records. (Smith, who did not hear the story until years later, was white.)

Player selections

Round one

Round two

Round three

Round four

Round five

Round six

Round seven

Round eight

Round nine

Round ten

Round eleven

Round twelve

Round thirteen

Round fourteen

Round fifteen

Round sixteen

Round seventeen

Round eighteen

Round nineteen

Round twenty

Round twenty-one

Round twenty-two

Round twenty-three

Round twenty-four

Round twenty-five

Round twenty-six

Round twenty-seven

Round twenty-eight

Round twenty-nine

Round thirty

Notable undrafted players

Hall of Famers
 Hugh McElhenny, halfback from Washington taken 1st round 9th overall by the San Francisco 49ers.
Inducted: Professional Football Hall of Fame class of 1970.
 Gino Marchetti, defensive end from San Francisco taken 2nd round 14th overall by the New York Yanks.
Inducted: Professional Football Hall of Fame class of 1972.
 Ollie Matson, halfback from San Francisco taken 1st round 3rd overall by the Chicago Cardinals.
Inducted: Professional Football Hall of Fame class of 1972.
 Dick "Night Train" Lane, defensive back attending Junior College was undrafted and signed as a free agent by the Los Angeles Rams.
Inducted: Professional Football Hall of Fame class of 1974.
 Frank Gifford, halfback from USC taken 1st round 11th overall by the New York Giants.
Inducted: Professional Football Hall of Fame class of 1977.
 Yale Lary, defensive back from Texas A&M taken 3rd round 34th overall by the Detroit Lions.
Inducted: Professional Football Hall of Fame class of 1979.
 Les Richter, linebacker from California taken 1st round 2nd overall by the New York Yanks.
Inducted: Professional Football Hall of Fame class of 2011.
 Bobby Dillon, defensive back from Texas taken 3rd round 28th overall by the Green Bay Packers.
Inducted: Professional Football Hall of Fame class of 2020.
 George Young, tackle from Bucknell taken 26th round 302nd overall by the New York Yanks.
Inducted: For his Executive achievements Professional Football Hall of Fame Class of 2020.

References

External links
 NFL.com – 1952 Draft
 databaseFootball.com – 1952 Draft
 Pro Football Hall of Fame

National Football League Draft
Draft
NFL Draft
1950s in Manhattan
American football in New York City
Sports in Manhattan
Sporting events in New York City
NFL Draft